Kasaba is a 2016 Indian Malayalam-language action thriller film written and directed by Nithin Renji Panicker, starring Mammootty, along with Neha Saxena as his pair, while Varalaxmi, Sampath Raj, and Jagadish played the important supporting roles. The first day gross was the highest for a Malayalam film.  The film ended up grossing

Plot
Rajan Zachariah is a cop posted at Palakkad district. Zachariah is a person who doesn't give a thought about what people think, and is very close to IG Chandrasekhar and his son Arjun. Arjun and his fiancée die mysteriously in Kaliyoor – a place located on the Kerala-Karnataka border. As per the police reports the deaths were due to Maoist attacks, but Chandrasekhar and Zachariah refuse to believe it. Being the godfather of Arjun, Zachariah asks Chandrasekhar to post him at Kaliyoor to find out the truth, who arrives at Kaliyoor and tries to solve the mystery behind deaths of Arjun and his fiancée and finds that the couple's death are connected to the death of 6 cops and CI Raghavan. Zachariah finds that the village head Parameshwaran Nambiar, along with Kamala, the in-charge of the brothel along had killed Raghavan. 

Arjun and his fiancée witness the murder and flees. While escaping from Nambiar's goons, Arjun and his fiancée get into a police van asking help by introducing himself as I.G.'s son. Nambiar instructs his goons to attack the police van thereby killing Arjun and his fiancée, along with the 6 cops. Nambiar who is contesting district level elections, finds the caretaker of Kamala's brothel Thankachan, as a possible liability and kills him through his goons under the guise of a Maoist attack. It is later revealed in a letter (written by Thankachan before his death) that Kamala is Thankachan's daughter. Enraged, Kamala kills Nambiar with the help of Zachariah, and later calls Zachariah to thank him for helping her and she intends to finish him off to wipe the slate clean. Zachariah tactfully arrests her for killing Raghavan and Nambiar by acting friendly, where he also rescues the workers from the brothel.

Cast
Mammootty as Rajan Zachariah, Circle Inspector of Police
Neha Saxena as Susan Rajan Zachariah
Jagadish as Sub-inspector (S. I.) Mukundan 
Sampath Raj as Parameshwaran Nambiar
Varalaxmi as Kamala 
Maqbool Salmaan as Jagan 
Sandeep Narayanan as a Goon
Shaheen Siddique as Arjun
Siddique as Inspector-general (I.G.) Chandrashekhar IPS, Arjun's father
Rakendu as Professor Jacob
Alencier Ley Lopez as Thankachan, Kamala's father
Biju Pappan as C.I. Raghavan
Jennifer Antony as Pavizham, S. I. Mukundan's wife 
Abu Salim as Pazhani
Sasi Kalinga as Linguswamy
Chinnu Kuruvila

Production
In January 2016, it was reported that Mammootty would star in Nithin Renji Panicker's directorial debut, the son of Malayalam screenwriter Renji Panicker. Raai Laxmi was earlier reported to be as the heroine, but later Varalaxmi Sarathkumar was confirmed to be part of the film.

The filming commenced in February 2016, and the unit filmed in locations of Kozhikode, Kolar Gold Fields and Pazhani. The filming ended in April.

Release
The film was scheduled for an Eid release, on 7 July. The film's teaser has become one of the most viewed Malayalam film teaser, by completing 5.1 Lakhs (510,000) "real-time" views in 24 hours.
At the time, the Kasaba teaser was the fastest Malayalam teaser to cross the 1 million mark, doing so in four days.

Claims of misogyny 
On 19 July 2016, Kerala Women's Commission sent court notices to actor Mammootty, director Nitin Panicker, and producer Alice George for allegedly portraying women in poor light in the film. Commission chairperson, K C Rosakutty Teacher, said that the film used dialogues which were "insulting to womanhood in general". She added, "In the name of freedom of expression, women cannot be insulted whether it is for character or else". When an actor like Mammootty involves in such projects, it may lead to a "dangerous acceptance" of such actions and remarks in the society. The Commission also sent a report to AMMA and Malayalam Cine Technicians Association with a request to revise the film's certification.

In one of the most controversial scenes in the film, the rogue police officer character portrayed by Mammootty, walks over to a female police officer, pulls at her belt and tells her that he can make her miss her menstrual cycle. This scene came under severe criticism right from the film's release. In December 2017, specifically referring to this scene, actress Parvathy criticised the film as having misogynistic dialogue. She faced threats by a section of Mammootty fans, after which she filed a police complaint on 26 December. Several people came in support of Parvathy and the controversy sparked a discussion on misogyny in the entire film industry of Kerala, with several actresses mainly under the aegis of Women in Cinema Collective, came to the front questioning the male dominance in Malayalam cinema.

Box office
The film received mixed reviews from the critics and was declared an average venture at the box office. The movie collected  in Kerala on its first day.

References

External links
 

2016 films
Films scored by Rahul Raj
2010s Malayalam-language films
Films about human trafficking in India
Fictional portrayals of the Kerala Police
Films shot in Kozhikode
Films shot in Palakkad
Films shot in Karnataka
Films shot in Palani